The 1952 Stanley Cup Finals was contested by the Detroit Red Wings and the Montreal Canadiens in the first of the four Detroit-Montreal Finals series of the 1950s. The Canadiens were appearing in their second straight Finals series, while Detroit was returning after winning in 1950. The Red Wings won the series 4–0, shutting out the Canadiens twice and allowing one goal in each of the other two games. By doing so, the Red Wings became the first team to go perfect in the playoffs.

Paths to the Finals
Detroit defeated the defending champion Toronto Maple Leafs 4–0 to reach the Finals. Montreal defeated the Boston Bruins 4–3 to reach the Finals.

Game summaries
Terry Sawchuk posted two shutouts in his Cup Finals debut. Gordie Howe scored two goals in his Cup Finals debut.

Stanley Cup engraving
The 1952 Stanley Cup was presented to Red Wings captain Sid Abel by NHL President Clarence Campbell following the Red Wings 3–0 win over the Canadiens in game four.

The following Red Wings players and staff had their names engraved on the Stanley Cup

1951–52 Detroit Red Wings

Stanley Cup engraving
 3 players were engraved on the Stanley Cup, but did not play for Detroit.  Glenn Hall played his first NHL game in 1952–53 Season.  Bill Tibbs never played in the NHL.  Hugh Coflin never played for Detroit. Coflin's only NHL Season was 1950–51 when he played 31 games for the Chicago Blackhawks.
 Glenn Hall was listed as GLEN HALL on the original engraving in 1952. When the cup was redone in 1957–58, Hall was engraved on the Stanley Cup as GLIN HALL, a mistake that was repeated on the Replica Cup created in 1992–93. He was engraved before he played in first NHL game in 1952–53 season. Glenn Hall went on to play a record 502 consecutive complete games.
 Enio Sclisizzi name was removed when cup was redone in 1957–58. He played only nine games, and did not play in the playoffs. Coflin, Tibbs, and Hall, who did not play for Detroit in 1952, were nevertheless included on the new version of the Stanley Cup. Coflin's name was not included on the Replica Stanley Cup created in 1993.

See also
 1951–52 NHL season

Notes

References
 
 

Stanley Cup
Stanley Cup Finals
Stanley Cup Finals
Ice hockey competitions in Montreal
Ice hockey competitions in Detroit
Stanley Cup
1950s in Montreal
1952 in Quebec
1952 in Detroit